Dolni Tsibar is a village in Valchedram Municipality, Montana Province, northwestern Bulgaria. 

Most people are  Romani and belong to the Bulgarian Orthodox Church. The village Dolni Tsibar is one of the few places with a constant population increase over the years, mainly due to its high birth rate. Dolni Tsibar has a median age of 30 years old: children under 15 years old constitute around 25% of the population, while elderly (65+) constitute less than 7%.

References

Villages in Montana Province